Oxford Football Club was a Scottish association football club based in the Crosshill area of Glasgow.

History

The club claimed a foundation date of 1869, but this probably refers to the cricket club from which the football club emerged.  The club's first recorded football matches did not take place until 1874,  the very first being a 0–0 draw against Rangers F.C. on Glasgow Green, and 1873–74 was the club's first season of football, with a record of 2 wins, 6 draws, and 3 defeats, scoring 9 and conceding 8.

The club competed in the Scottish Cup for seven seasons between 1874 and 1881.  The first tie the club played was a 2–0 defeat at Rangers in 1874–75, the first goal coming when McNeil "sent both the Oxford goalkeeper [M'Kinley] and the ball underneath the tape".  

The club only made it to the second round twice.  The first time, in 1878–79, was under the rule that both clubs advanced after two drawn matches; the club drew twice against Derby of Glasgow before losing 2–1 at Govan F.C. in the second round.

The second occasion was in 1880–81, when a 6–0 victory against the Maxwell club, thanks to goals from Kaye (2), Martin, Smith, M'Lean, and Dunlop, was the club's only win in the competition.  The club lost 4–3 at Cowlairs F.C. in the second round in a "fast and speedy" match, and the club does not appear to have played again; although it entered the 1881–82 Scottish Cup, it scratched before the first round tie with Pilgrims of Glasgow.

Colours

The club played in blue and white jerseys with red stockings.

Ground

The club originally played at Queen's Park.  From 1879 the club played at Bellevue Park.

External links

Scottish Cup ties

References 

Defunct football clubs in Scotland
Association football clubs established in 1873
1873 establishments in Scotland
Association football clubs disestablished in 1881
1881 disestablishments in Scotland
Football clubs in Glasgow